Han-jae is a Korean masculine given name. Its meaning differs based on the hanja used to write each syllable of the name. There are 23 hanja with the reading "han" and 20 hanja with the reading "jae" on the South Korean government's official list of hanja that may be registered for use in given names.

People with this name include:
Ji Han-jae (born 1936), South Korean hapkido practitioner
Ri Han-jae (born 1982), North Korean football player

See also
List of Korean given names

References

Korean masculine given names